Márta Gulyás (born 1953 in Gyula, Hungary) is a performing pianist and a professor of piano and chamber music.

Biography
Márta Gulyás studied piano at the Liszt Ferenc University for Music in Budapest, Hungary with Erzsébet Tusa and István Lantos. In 1976, she received the artistic and pedagogic diplomas there. She then completed a post-graduate program at the Tschaikowski Conservatory in Moscow with professor Dmitri Bashkirow. In 2001, Márta Gulyás habilitated herself at the Liszt Ferenc University and was awarded the title of Magistra Habilitatam.

Márta Gulyás teaches piano and chamber music at the Liszt Ferenc University since 1979, first as assistant professor, then as docent. For several years she was dean of the chamber music faculty. Since 1991, Márta Gulyás is also visiting professor at the Reina Sofía School of Music in Madrid, Spain.

In addition to numerous concerts in Hungary, Márta Gulyás also performed in Switzerland, Germany, France, Italy, England, Ireland, Austria, Poland, Finland, Sweden, the Netherlands, Czech Republic, Slovakia, Russia, Croatia, Kazakhstan, Cyprus, Lebanon, Syria, Turkey and the United States. In recent years, her focus has turned towards chamber music.

Márta Gulyás gave and is giving master classes in Finland (Riihimäki, Lohia); Sweden (Göteborg); Italy (Bergamo, Imola, Rome); Spain (Santander, Ávila, Getafe, Salamanca, Valenzia, Segovia, Amendralejo, Badajoz, Pamplona, Cáceres, Palma); Greece (Athens); Germany (Weimar, Pommersfelden, Würzburg); Austria (Reichenau, Salzburg); Turkey (Cappadocia, Istanbul); Japan (Tokyo, Nagoya, Fukuoka, Okinawa); and Hungary (Keszthely, Békéscsaba, Miskolc, Szeged, Győr).

Márta Gulyás is a member of the jury for the award of Wardwell Scholarships of the Alexander von Humboldt Foundation. She is repeated president of the preselection jury and member of the jury in the Paloma O'Shea International Piano Competition of Santander (Spain). She has repeatedly been interviewed on TV and Radio.

Márta Gulyás speaks Hungarian, Russian, German, English, French, Spanish and Italian.

Awards and recognition 

 Debussy-Piano-Competition Paris 1971: Third Prize
 Leo Weiner Chambermusic-Competition Budapest 1978: First Prize
 Piano-Competition of the Hungarian Radio 1979: Third Prize
 MIDEM Prize for Bartók‘s Early Chambermusik (with Vilmos Szabadi)
 Hungarian Culture-Prize 1985
 Liszt Ferenc Prize 1998
 Medal of Honor from Queen Sofia of Spain 2014 and 2018
 Leó Weiner Memorial Award 2017 
 Hungarian State Order of Merit 2018

Recordings
CD Recordings with Hungaroton (Hungary) and BIBLIOservice (Holland)
Recordings with Hungarian Radio, BBC, Bavarian Radio, NDR, WDR, Finnish Radio, Radio France, and Radio Orpheo (Moscow).

References

External links
http://www.santanderpianocompetition.com/C_Jurado_Componente.aspx?id=1044 
http://www.kk-en.org/maacuterta-gulyaacutes-piano.html
https://itunes.apple.com/us/artist/marta-gulyas/id261959980
http://comunicacion.universidadeuropea.es/profesor/marta-gulyas
http://zeneakademia.hu/en/the-university/teaching-staff/-/asset_publisher/Ovew9Ez6tmx1/content/gulyas-marta/10192;jsessionid=301515BE7CE290FC98287922F9607EC4
http://www.escuelasuperiordemusicareinasofia.es/E_ClaustroAcademico_CatedraMusicaCamara.aspx
http://propart.client.jp/MartaGulyasinfoen.html
https://web.archive.org/web/20160921081953/http://www.bekesbartok.hu/piano_masterclass.htm
http://fidelio.hu/eduart/2011/04/12/gulyas_marta_haromszaz_ev_sem_lenne_elegendo/
https://web.archive.org/web/20160921081902/https://www.collegium-musicum.info/index.php/de/dozenten
https://www.humboldt-foundation.de/web/auswahlausschuss-wardwell.html
http://www.concursodepianodesantander.com/C_NoticiasFicha.aspx?idioma=en&id=726
In Memoriam: Hungarian Composers, Victims Of The Holocaust
http://www.elmundo.es/cultura/2015/04/10/55280ef2e2704ef74d8b456c.html

REDIRECT

Living people
Hungarian classical pianists
Hungarian women pianists
People from Gyula
1953 births
Academic staff of the Reina Sofía School of Music
20th-century Hungarian musicians
20th-century classical musicians
21st-century Hungarian musicians
21st-century classical musicians
21st-century classical pianists
Women classical pianists
20th-century women pianists
21st-century women pianists